Pseudomonas leptonychotis is a Gram-negative bacterium from the genus of Pseudomonas which has been isolated from a Weddell seal from the James Ross Island.

References

Pseudomonadales
Bacteria described in 2020